Kleine Gigue in G major, K. 574, is a composition for solo piano by Wolfgang Amadeus Mozart during his stay in Leipzig. It is dated 16 May 1789, the day before he left Leipzig. It was directly written into the notebook of Leipzig court organist . It is often cited as a tribute by Mozart to J. S. Bach, although many scholars have likened it to Handel's Gigue from the Suite No. 8 in F minor, HWV 433. In fact, the subject of the gigue bears a marked similarity to the subject of J. S. Bach's B minor fugue  from Book 1 of Das Wohltemperierte Klavier. Mozart has changed the tempo from Largo to Allegro deciso and the time signature from common time to  but the similarity between the two is unmistakable.

The gigue consists of only 38 bars and is written in  time. The bass line in the last four bars of the first half, and its transposed repetition in the second half before the coda, are notable for including all tones of the chromatic scale. However they are not tone rows as some tones are repeated.

Pyotr Ilyich Tchaikovsky based the opening movement of his Mozartiana orchestral suite on this work.

References

Further reading
Mozart's Piano Music by William Kinderman, Oxford University Press,

External links

, Jörg Demus, 1962

Compositions by Wolfgang Amadeus Mozart
Compositions for solo piano
1789 compositions
Music dedicated to family or friends
Compositions in G major